Stacey Dwayne Bailey (born February 10, 1960) is a former American football wide receiver. He played college football at San Jose State. He was drafted in the third round (63rd overall) of the 1982 NFL Draft by the Atlanta Falcons.

Early years
Bailey attended Terra Linda High School in San Rafael, California and was a letterman in football. He then attended San Jose State University. As a freshman in 1978, he appeared in 12 games. He recorded 23 receptions for 354 yards. As a sophomore in 1979, he appeared in 11 games. He recorded 44 receptions for 674 yards and three touchdowns. In 1980, as a junior, he appeared in 11 games. He recorded 30 receptions for 686 yards and four touchdowns. For the season, he was named All-Conference. As a senior in 1981, he appeared in 12 games. He recorded 27 receptions for 517 yards and six touchdowns. He was also named an All-American as well as All-Conference.

Career statistics

Professional career
Bailey was selected in the third round (63rd overall) of the 1982 NFL Draft by the Atlanta Falcons. As a rookie, he appeared in five games. He recorded two receptions for 24 yards and one touchdown. In 1983, he appeared in 14 games (12 starts). He recorded 55 receptions for 881 yards and six touchdowns. The following season, 1984 was statistically his best, as well as only full 16 game season. He started all 16 games, and recorded 67 receptions for 1,138 yards and six touchdowns. In 1985, he appeared in 15 games (13 starts). He recorded 30 receptions for 364 yards. In 1986, he appeared in six games (one start). He recorded three receptions for 39 yards. In 1987, he appeared in seven games (six starts). He recorded 20 receptions for 325 yards and three touchdowns. In 1988, he started all 10 games he appeared in. He recorded 17 receptions for 437 yards and, the final two touchdowns of his career. In 1989, he appeared in 15 games. He recorded eight receptions for 170 yards. In 1990, he appeared in just three games (one start). He recorded four receptions for 44 yards before his season was ended by an injury, in October 1990. He was released in September 1990 during final cuts.

Career statistics

Personal life
, Bailey is an instructor at Football University. His son, Sean, was a wide receiver for the University of Georgia.

References

External links
 Football University bio

1960 births
Living people
Sportspeople from San Rafael, California
American football wide receivers
San Jose State Spartans football players
Atlanta Falcons players